Annandale-on-Hudson is a hamlet in Dutchess County, New York,  United States, located in the Hudson Valley town of Red Hook, across the Hudson River from Kingston. The hamlet consists mainly of the Bard College campus.

Municipal services
Emergency services at Annandale-on-Hudson are provided by the municipal Red Hook Police Department, the Dutchess County Sheriff's Office, New York State Police, Red Hook Volunteer Fire Company, and Tivoli Volunteer Fire Company. Students, faculty, and staff of Bard College also receive on-campus emergency assistance from Bard College Safety and Security and the student-run Bard EMS.

History
The Munsee and Muhheaconneok people were the original inhabitants of this area and, due to forced migration, now reside in Northeast Wisconsin and are known as the Stockbridge-Munsee Community.

The town takes its name from an estate donated by John Bard and his wife to Columbia University so that a college could be formed there. Today, Bard College stands on the land that John Bard donated. Bard College houses the only post office for Annandale-on-Hudson's ZIP code, 12504. The land comprising Annandale-on-Hudson, sometimes abbreviated to "Annandale", is mostly owned by Bard College. Here also a few private residences, small businesses, and undeveloped land controlled by the New York State Department of Environmental Conservation.

Annandale-on-Hudson, despite its size, has a significant history. Blithewood, a mansion designed by Francis L. V. Hoppin, an alumnus of the architectural firm of McKim, Mead and White for Andrew C. Zabriskie in 1899, replaced an earlier mansion by the same name remodeled for Robert Donaldson Jr. by architect Alexander Jackson Davis. The current Blithewood was donated to Bard College in 1951 by the Zabriskie family and, today, houses the Levy Economics Institute at Bard College.  The Estate was originally part of a 1660 land transfer from Native owners to Peter Schuyler. The Manor Estate is another historical mansion located on campus.

Bard College's resident archaeologist Christopher Lindner has extensively researched the history of this area.

In popular culture
 Annandale-on-Hudson is the hometown of the Marvel Comics character Jean Grey of the X-Men. Chris Claremont, best known as for his run on the X-Men comic book, attended Bard. 
 Annandale-on-Hudson is referenced in the Steely Dan song "My Old School".

Gallery

References

Further reading
Great Houses of the Hudson River, Michael Middleton Dwyer, editor, with preface by Mark Rockefeller, Boston, MA: Little, Brown and Company, published in association with Historic Hudson Valley, 2001. .

External resources 

 
Hamlets in New York (state)
Red Hook, New York
Poughkeepsie–Newburgh–Middletown metropolitan area
Hamlets in Dutchess County, New York
New York (state) populated places on the Hudson River